Grand Ayatollah Hossein Noori-Hamedani (born March 21, 1925) is an Iranian Twelver Shi'a Marja. 

He has expressed his strong disapproval of Sufis and dervishes, Jews, the intellectual Abdolkarim Soroush and the UN Convention on the Elimination of All Forms of Discrimination Against Women.

Biography
Hosein Nuri-Hamadani was born in Hamadan, Iran. After finishing elementary studies in Hamadan, at the age of 17 he moved to Qom, Iran to continue his religious studies. He studied in the seminaries of Allameh Tabatabai and Grand Ayatollah Borujerdi. He currently resides and teaches in the Seminary of Qom.

Views and activities
Among his reported views are that Iran "must purge universities of anti-Islamic and atheist professors." In September 2006, he called for a clampdown on dervish groups in Qom. He also issued a fatwa against the attendance of women in stadiums. In early 2008, he issued what some see as an implicit death threat against Iranian intellectual Abdolkarim Soroush, saying "Soroush’s writings are worse than Salman Rushdie's", and  "Abdolkarim Soroush’s religious theories have undermined the roots of prophecy, the Quran and holy revelations".

In connection with the Iranian legislature's ratification of a bill on Iranian membership in the UN Convention on the Elimination of All Forms of Discrimination Against Women (CEDAW), ISNA reported Nuri-Hamadani issued a statement on 2 August 2003 describing the convention as "calamitous and tragic, as well as a Western and U.S. ploy to harm Islam." According to him, when the convention was brought to Qom, all the religious authorities opposed it as contrary to Islam.

In 2022, he urged the Iranian government to listen to the demands of the protestors.

See also

Grand Ayatollahs
Marja
Lists of Maraji
List of members in the First Term of the Council of Experts

Notes

External links

 Iran move to defrock dissident ayatollah opens rifts in theocracy CSMonitor
Nouri Hamedani speaks about Wahabbism

People from Hamadan
1925 births
Living people
Iranian grand ayatollahs
Society of Seminary Teachers of Qom members